The Günther Hamburg Classics was a golf tournament on the Challenge Tour between 2000 and 2002. It was played annually near Hamburg, Germany.

Winners

Notes

References

External links
Coverage on the Challenge Tour's official site

Former Challenge Tour events
Golf tournaments in Germany